Mohammad Jafar Pouyandeh (also spelled Mohammad-Jafar Pooyandeh or Mohammad Jafar Poyandeh) (7 June 1954 – 8 or 9 December 1998) was an Iranian writer, translator and activist. He was a member of the Iranian Writers Association, a group who had been long banned in Iran due to their objection to censorship and encouraged freedom of expression. He was most likely murdered during the Chain murders of Iran in 1998.

Biography 
Pouyandeh worked at the Cultural Research Institute and was working on translating a book called Questions & Answer about Human Rights at the time of his death. Pouyandeh was not a well known writer, translator, or activist in Iran and he is essentially known for his unusual circumstance of death.

Pouyandeh was last seen alive leaving his office at four o'clock in the afternoon of December 8, 1998 and still hadn't returned home three days later when his wife wrote and delivered a letter to Iran's President expressing her anguish over his disappearance. His body was discovered December 11. in the Shahriar district of Karaj, south of Tehran, and he appeared to have been strangled.

See also
Ahmad Tafazzoli
Chain murders of Iran
List of solved missing person cases
List of unsolved murders
Mohammad Mokhtari

References

External links
NY Times article, As Slain Secular Writer Is Buried, Iran Blames a Foreign 'Network' from December 16th, 1998
The Iranian article,You Will Answer, One Day from December 12, 2002

1954 births
1990s missing person cases
1998 deaths
20th-century translators
Burials at Emamzadeh Taher
Deaths by strangulation
Formerly missing people
Iranian critics
Iranian murder victims
Iranian translators
Iranian Writers Association members
Missing person cases in Iran
Male murder victims
People murdered in Iran
Persian-language writers
Unsolved murders in Iran